Edward Arthur Lawrence (November 2, 1831 Bay Side, Queens County, New York – 1883) was an American politician from New York.

Life
He was the son of Effingham Lawrence (1779–1850), First Judge of the Queens County Court from 1818 to 1823, and Ann (Townsend) Lawrence (1786–1845). On December 7, 1855, he married Hannah Russell Mickle (b. 1837), daughter of Mayor of New York Andrew H. Mickle (1805–1863).

As a Democrat, he was Supervisor of the Town of Flushing for twelve years, a member of the New York State Assembly (Queens Co., 1st D.) in 1858 and 1859, and a member of the New York State Senate (1st D.) in 1860 and 1861.

He was buried at the Lawrence Burying Ground in Bay Side.

Assemblyman Solomon Townsend (1746–1811) was his grandfather; State Senator Samuel Townsend (d. 1790) was his great-grandfather.

Sources
 The New York Civil List compiled by Franklin Benjamin Hough, Stephen C. Hutchins and Edgar Albert Werner (1867; pg. 442, 486 and 489)
 Biographical Sketches of the State Officers and Members of the Legislature of the State of New York by William D. Murphy (1861; pg. 76ff)
 OBITUARY NOTES; E. A. LAWRENCE, a prominent Democratic politician... in NYT on June 5, 1883

External links

1831 births
1883 deaths
Townsend family
Democratic Party New York (state) state senators
People from Queens, New York
Democratic Party members of the New York State Assembly
Town supervisors in New York (state)
19th-century American politicians